Gabriele Wohmann (née Guyot; May 21, 1932 –  June 22, 2015) was a German novelist, and short story writer.

Life
Wohmann was born in Darmstadt. She attended the Nordseepädagogium on the island Langeoog as a boarding school. She studied at Frankfurt am Main from 1951 to 1953. She then worked as a teacher at her former school to Langeoog, at a community college, and a business school. In 1953, she married Reiner Wohmann. She lived as a freelance writer in Darmstadt since 1956. Wohmann died on June 23, 2015, after struggling for a long time with serious illness in the place of her birth, Darmstadt.

Career
Wohmann authored short stories, novels, poems, radio plays, television plays, and essays. She attended meetings of the Group 47. She was a member of the Berlin Academy of Arts since 1975, and the German Academy for Language and Literature in Darmstadt since 1980. She was a member of the PEN Centre of the Federal Republic of Germany from 1960 to 1988.

Works
Jetzt und Nie, Luchterhand, Darmstadt/Neuwied, 1958
Abschied für länger, Walter, Olten/Freiburg im Breisgau, 1965
Ernste Absicht, Luchterhand Verlag, Berlin/Neuwied, 1970
Paulinchen war allein zu Haus, Luchterhand, Darmstadt/Neuwied, 1974
Schönes Gehege, Luchterhand, Darmstadt/Neuwied, 1975
Ausflug mit der Mutter, Luchterhand, Darmstadt/Neuwied, 1976
Frühherbst in Badenweiler, Luchterhand, Darmstadt, 1978
Ach wie gut daß niemand weiß, Luchterhand, Darmstadt/Neuwied, 1980
Das Glücksspiel, Luchterhand, Darmstadt/Neuwied, 1981
Der Flötenton, Luchterhand, Darmstadt/Neuwied, 1987
Bitte nicht sterben, Piper, München, 1993
Aber das war noch nicht das Schlimmste, Piper, München, 1995
Das Handicap, Piper, München, 1996
Das Hallenbad, Piper, München, 2000
Abschied von der Schwester, Pendo, Zürich/München, 2001
Schön und gut, Piper, München, 2002
Hol mich einfach ab, Piper, München, 2003

Works in English
Selected Translations of Gabriele Wohmann, Steven Walter Eau Claire, University of Iowa, 1984
A Sea Resort, Translator Steven W. Eau Claire, The Journal of Literary Translation, Volume XVI, Spring 1986 
The Piano Lesson, Translator Steven W. Eau Claire, The Amherst Review, Volume XIV, 1986
A Party in the Country, Translator Steve Eau Claire, The Antioch Review, Volume 45, Number 3, Summer 1987 
The cherry tree, Translator Jeanne Willson, Dimension, 1994,

References

External links

"So spannend ist das Leben nicht", Berliner Zeitung, Benoît Pivert, 18 May 2002
Günter Häntzschel, Gabriele Wohmann, Beck, 1982, 

1932 births
2015 deaths
20th-century German educators
German women novelists
Writers from Darmstadt
20th-century German novelists
20th-century German women writers
Commanders Crosses of the Order of Merit of the Federal Republic of Germany
Recipients of the Order of Merit of Baden-Württemberg